Eugene Blackmon Jr. was a Chicago firefighter and scuba diver, who died in the course of duty, on May 19, 1998.  On July 31, 2017, the Chicago Fire Department named a new fireboat the Eugene Blackmon, in his honor.

Early life
Blackmon was born in Chicago, and grew up on Chicago's south side.  He attended Harlan High School, Chicago State University, and qualified to work as a lifeguard and a scuba instructor.

Career
Prior to joining the Chicago Fire Department, in 1987, Blackmon had worked for several years as a lifeguard, and later was a bus driver for the Chicago Transit Authority.

Death
After a man was reported to have accidentally entered the Little Calumet River, and another man disappeared, after diving in, in a rescue attempt, Blackmon and three other Fire Department divers were assigned to look for them.

During his third dive Blackmon surfaced, with his equipment askew.  Colleagues weren't able to immediately retrieve him. When he was retrieved he had been submerged for ten minutes, after being airlifted to a nearby hospital he was pronounced dead on arrival.

Legacy
The Chicago Fire Department created an annual award in Blackmon's name, given to firefighter candidates who were perceived to have shown leadership.

On July 31, 2017, Blackmon's family participated in the christening of new fireboat, named after Blackmon.

References

1959 births
1998 deaths
People from Chicago
American firefighters